Dan Watchurst (born 15 March 1990, Bristol) is a former Welsh rugby union player for Newport RFC and the Newport Gwent Dragons. He captained the Wales under-20 national team.

A prop forward, Watchurst previously played for Ebbw Vale RFC, Bedwas RFC, Pontypool RFC and the Newport Gwent Dragons Under-20 regional team. He made his debut for the Newport Gwent Dragons senior team versus Sale Sharks on 6 November 2009.

On 22 December 2009, he was named in the Wales Under 20 Squad for the 2010 Under-20 Six Nations tournament. On 1 February 2010, Watchurst was named as captain for the first two matches of the tournament. In May 2010, he was named as Wales Under-20 captain for the Junior World Cup in Argentina in June 2010.

Watchurst retired from rugby at the end of the 2012–13 season due to recurring injury.

References

External links
Newport Gwent Dragons profile

Rugby union players from Bristol
Welsh rugby union players
Dragons RFC players
Newport RFC players
1990 births
Living people
People educated at Colston's School
Rugby union props